Warren Foster (October 24, 1904 – December 13, 1971) was an American writer, cartoonist and composer for the animation division of Warner Brothers and later with Hanna-Barbera.

Early life
He was born in Brooklyn, New York to Marion B. Foster and Charles C. Foster.
Foster was educated at Brooklyn Technical High School and later at the Pratt Institute, joining ASCAP in 1956.

Career
Foster's long career with animation began in 1935 as a cel opaquer for Fleischer Studios, moving up to the story department a year later. He wrote two Popeye cartoons The Spinach Roadster and Proteck the Weakerist. He started at Warner Bros Cartoons in 1938 as a writer on the Porky Pig short, Porky in Wackyland, and would collaborate primarily with Bob Clampett until the early 1940s. By 1944, Foster had become both Clampett and Frank Tashlin's primary storyman; upon the departure of both directors, Tashlin's replacement Robert McKimson became Foster's sole collaborator for the remainder of the 1940s. In 1949, veteran director Friz Freleng, who had become increasingly complimentary of Foster's abilities, poached Foster from McKimson's unit and installed him as his primary storyman, a position Foster would hold until 1957 with the Tweety short, Tweet Dreams (ultimately released in 1959); Foster, having written around 171 shorts for the studio, would depart Warner's after finishing work on the short. He was the composer of Tweety's theme song, I Taut I Taw a Puddy Tat.

He worked, sometimes uncredited, on cartoons considered among the greatest ever, including Porky in Wackyland, Book Revue, Show Biz Bugs, The Great Piggy Bank Robbery and Daffy Doodles, the latter four featuring Daffy Duck, Catty Cornered featuring Sylvester the Cat in 1953 and Bugs and Thugs featuring Bugs Bunny in 1954.

His career took an upward turn in 1959 at Hanna-Barbera, where he spent the next seven years as a writer on a number of notable animated programs, beginning with The Huckleberry Hound Show. He contributed to the comedy, plot and character development of shows such as The Yogi Bear Show, Loopy De Loop and The Flintstones, including his final work on the feature-length The Man Called Flintstone in 1966.

Iwao Takamoto said of Foster's work on The Flintstones: "I believe his influence was one of the key factors for its success".

Foster is credited with the controversial banned cartoon Coal Black and de Sebben Dwarfs.

Death
Warren Foster died on December 13, 1971 in San Clemente, California. His burial is located at El Toro Memorial Park in Lake Forest, California.

References

External links

1904 births
1971 deaths
Animators from New York (state)
American television writers
American male screenwriters
American male composers
Animation composers
Animation screenwriters
Pratt Institute alumni
Writers from Brooklyn
20th-century American composers
American male television writers
Hanna-Barbera people
Warner Bros. Cartoons people
Brooklyn Technical High School alumni
Screenwriters from New York (state)
20th-century American male musicians
Fleischer Studios people
20th-century American male writers
20th-century American screenwriters